Martin Puckett (born 1992) is an English international male lawn and Indoor bowler.

Biography
He won the National Junior title in 2014. In 2015 he was selected for the England team for the 2015 British Isles Senior International Series.

In 2019, Puckett won the senior mixed doubles title with Devon Cooper at the IIBC Championships.  

In February 2019, Puckett won the Mens English National Indoor Singles Champion of Champions. 

In March 2022, Puckett won the Mens English National Indoor Singles Championship.

References

1992 births
Living people
English male bowls players